Christopher Cox (born September 2, 1982) is a software engineer and business leader. He is the Chief Product Officer (CPO) at Meta Platforms. He serves as chief of staff to Meta CEO Mark Zuckerberg on product development and is responsible for its "family of apps": Facebook, WhatsApp, Instagram, and Messenger.

Early life and education
Cox was born in Atlanta, Georgia, and raised in Winnetka, Illinois. He is the youngest of three children. He attended New Trier High School, where he played in the jazz band. Cox attended Stanford University, where he received a bachelor's degree in 2003 in symbolic systems with a concentration in artificial intelligence. He dropped out of the natural language processing group and his graduate degree program at Stanford to join Facebook in 2005.

Career 
Cox joined Facebook in 2005 as one of its first 15 software engineers, where he was instrumental in designing and building first versions of key Facebook features including News Feed. He then became Director of Human Resources, building out Facebook's HR and recruiting programs and leading the process of defining the company's mission and values. In 2008, he became the Vice President of Product, where he built Facebook's product management (PM) and design teams, before being promoted to Chief Product Officer in 2014.

In May 2018, he was put in charge of its apps: Facebook, Instagram, WhatsApp and Messenger.

At the age of 28, Cox was listed on the Forbes 40 Under 40 list, as well as Fast Company's list of "Most Creative People in Business". In 2015, Forbes described him as "The Most Important Executive In Silicon Valley That No One Is Talking About". 

In March 2019, Cox announced that he was leaving Facebook, as the company aimed for new leadership as part of its new direction towards an encrypted, integrated messaging network. He returned to the company in June 2020. On June 11, 2020 it was announced that Cox would be returning to Facebook as their Chief Product Officer.

Personal life
Cox married a fellow Stanford University grad and movie director, Visra Vichit-Vadakan in 2010. The couple have a son and a daughter, together they live in California. Vichit-Vadakan is the granddaughter of Luang Wichitwathakan, a Thai politician, historian, novelist and playwright.

References

Meta Platforms people
Living people
Corporate executives
Stanford University alumni
American software engineers
People from Atlanta
People from Winnetka, Illinois
American technology chief executives
1982 births
Engineers from Illinois
New Trier High School alumni